The rivière aux Cèdres (in English: Cedar River) is a tributary of the east bank of the Henri River whose current flows successively into the rivière du Chêne and on the south shore of the St. Lawrence River.

The Cedars River flows through the municipalities of Saint-Agapit, Saint-Flavien, Dosquet, Saint-Janvier-de-Joly and Val-Alain, in the MRC of Lotbinière Regional County Municipality, in the administrative region of Chaudière-Appalaches, in Quebec, in Canada.

Geography 
The main neighboring watersheds of the Cèdres river are:
 North side: Huron River, rivière aux Ormes, St. Lawrence River;
 east side: Noire River, Beaurivage River, rivière aux Pins;
 south side: rivière aux Frênes, Henri River, rivière du Chêne;
 west side: Henri River, rivière du Chêne.

The Rivière aux Cèdres has its source in a marsh area straddling the intermunicipal boundaries of Saint-Agapit, Dosquet and Saint-Flavien.

  towards the southwest in the marsh area in Saint-Agapit;
  towards the southwest, in Saint-Flavien, crossing a marsh area, until the discharge of the "Right branch" de la rivière aux Cèdres";
  heading west, to route 271;
  westward, up to the limit of Dosquet;
  towards the west, up to the limit of Saint-Janvier-de-Joly;
  west, to a country road;
  westward, to highway 20;
  westward, up to its confluence.

The Rivière aux Cèdres flows into a bend in the river on the east bank of the Henri River in the municipality of Val-Alain. This confluence is located downstream from the confluence of the rivière aux Frênes and upstream from the confluence of the Henri River.

Toponymy 
The toponym Rivière aux Cèdres was formalized on December 5, 1968, at the Commission de toponymie du Québec.

See also 

 List of rivers of Quebec

References 

Rivers of Chaudière-Appalaches
Lotbinière Regional County Municipality